Gaano Kadalas ang Minsan may refer to:
"Gaano Kadalas ang Minsan" (song), a song originally sung by Basil Valdez
Gaano Kadalas ang Minsan?, a 1982 Filipino film
Gaano Kadalas ang Minsan (TV series), a 2008 Filipino television series